Chrono Genesis (foaled 6 March 2016) is a Japanese Thoroughbred racehorse. She was one of the best two-year-old fillies in Japan when she won her first two races including the Ivy Stakes and then ran a close second in the Hanshin Juvenile Fillies. In the following year she won the Daily Hai Queen Cup and then contested all three legs of the Japanese Fillies' Triple Crown, finishing third in both the Oka Sho and the Yushun Himba before winning the Shuka Sho. As a four-year-old she won the Kyoto Kinen, Takarazuka Kinen and Arima Kinen.

Background
Chrono Genesis is a grey filly with a white star bred in Hokkaido by Northern Farm. She was sent into training with Takashi Saito at Rittō, Shiga and carries the red, black and yellow colours of Sunday Racing. She was ridden in most of her races by Yuichi Kitamura.

She was from the tenth crop of foals sired by Bago, an outstanding middle-distance runner in Europe whose biggest win came in the included the 2004 Prix de l'Arc de Triomphe. As a breeding stallion in Japan he started well but became disappointing: Chrono Genesis was his first Grade 1 winner since Big Week won the Kikuka Sho in 2010. Chrono Genesis's dam Chronologist, from whom she inherited her grey colour, showed modest racing ability, winning one minor race as a three-year-old in 2006. but as a broodmare she also produced Normcore. She was descended from the American broodmare Nimble Doll (foaled 1952), making her a distant relative of Captain Steve.

Racing career

2018: two-year-old season
Chrono Genesis began her racing career by winning an event for previously unraced juveniles over 1800 metres at Kokura Racecourse on 2 September. On 20 October she was stepped up in class for the Listed Ivy Stakes over the same distance at Tokyo Racecourse when she was the only filly in a ten-runner field and won by two lengths from Cosmo Calendula. Saito later commented "She waited patiently and went all out in the final stages and displayed the kind of kick we thought she would from her morning work". On 9 December the filly was moved up to the highest level for the Grade 1 Hanshin Juvenile Fillies over 1600 metres at Hanshin Racecourse and started the 2.6/1 second favourite in an eighteen-runner field. After starting slowly she was towards the rear for most of the race before making rapid progress in the straight and finishing second to the favoured Danon Fantasy, beaten half a length by the winner.

In the official ratings for Japanese two-year-olds Chrono Genesis was rated the second best juvenile filly of the year, one pound behind Danon Fantasy and six pounds below the top-rated colt Admire Mars.

2019: three-year-old season

On her first appearance as a three-year-old Chrono Genesis started 1.1/1 favourite for the Grade 2 Daily High Queen Cup (a trial for the Oka Sho) over 1800 metres at Toyo on 11 February. She came from sixth place on the final turn to win by a neck and half a length from Beach Samba and Jodie. In the Oka Sho over 1600 metres at Hanshin on 7 April the filly started the 4.7/1 third choice in the betting behind Danon Fantasy and Gran Alegria. After racing in mid-division Chrono Genesis was switched to the outside and produced a "powerful turn of speed" to take third place behind Gran Alegria and Shigeru Pink Dia. On 19 May at Tokyo Chrono Genesis was moved up in distance and made the second favourite behind Loves Only You for the 2400 metre Yushun Himba. She raced just behind the leaders for most of the way before keeping on well in the straight but never looked likely to win and finished third behind Loves Only You and the 93.1/1 outsider Curren Bouquetd'Or.

After a break of almost five months Chrono Genesis returned for the Shuka Sho over 2000 metres at Kyoto Racecourse on 13 October and started the 5.9/1 fourth choice in the betting behind Danon Fantasy, Curren Bouquetd'Or and Espoir. The other thirteen runners included Beach Samba, Shigeru Pink Dia, Contra Check (Flower Cup), Passing Through (Shion Stakes) and Schon Glanz (Artemis Stakes). Chrono Genesis settled behind the leaders as Danon Fantasy set the pace before being switched to the outside in the straight and launching a sustained run. She took the lead 200 metres from the finish and drew away in the closing stages to win by two lengths from Curren Bouquetd'Or with a further length and half back to Shigeru Pink Dia in third. After the race Yuichi Kitamura said "I was able to race her in an ideal position... I was able to make bid with confidence. I am grateful for having been able to ride the filly since her debut, I'm really glad that I was able to deliver a good result". Four weeks later the filly contested the Grade 1 Queen Elizabeth II Cup when she was matched against older fillies and mares for the first time and started the 2.5/1 second favourite. She was settled just behind the leaders for most of the way but was unable to make any significant progress in the straight and came home fifth of the eighteen runners, two lengths behind the winner Lucky Lilac.

In January 2020, at the JRA Awards for 2019, Chrono Genesis finished third behind Gran Alegria and Loves Only You in the poll to determine the JRA Award for Best Three-Year-Old Filly, taking 47 of the 274 votes.

2020: four-year-old season

Chrono Genesis began her 2020 campaign in the Grade 2 Kyoto Kinen over 2200 metres on 16 February and started the 1.7/1 favourite ahead of Curren Bouquetd'or, Stay Foolish (Kyoto Shimbun Hai) and Dreadnoughtus (Kyoto Daishoten). After racing in third place she took the lead in the straight and drew away to win by two and a half lengths from Curren Bouquetd'or. Restrictions imposed as a result of the COVID-19 pandemic meant that her next start, the Grade 1 Osaka Hai over 2000 metres at Hanshin on 5 April was run behind closed doors. Starting the 4/1 fifth choice in a field of twelve she settled behind the leaders before heading the front-running Danon Kingly in the straight but was overtaken in the closing stages and beaten a neck into second place by Lucky Lilac. 

At the same track on 28 June Chrono Genesis was one of eighteen horses to contest the 61st edition of the Grade 1 Takarazuka Kinen and started the 3.1/1 second favourite behind the four-year-old colt Saturnalia while the other contenders included Lucky Lilac, Blast Onepiece, Glory Vase, Kiseki (Kikuka Sho), Wagnerian and Persian Knight (Mile Championship). After settling in mid division, Chrono Genesis moved up on the outside to take second place behind Lucky Lilac on the final turn before gaining the advantage 300 metres from the finish and going clear of the field to win by six lengths. Kitamura commented "The filly broke smoothly and we were able to travel in good rhythm in good striking position. I didn't really have to urge her to go but she just went spontaneously. She was responding really well so I knew that she will stretch well in the lane. She has become a powerful filly and was in very good condition. She was really strong."

After a break of over four months Chrono Genesis returned to the track in November and started second favourite behind Almond Eye in the autumn running of the Tenno Sho over 2000 metres at Tokyo. She came from well off the pace with a strong late run in the straight to take third place, beaten half a length and a neck by Almond Eye and Fierement. In the poll which is used to select the field for the Arima Kinen over 2500 metres at Nakayama Racecourse Chrono Genesis topped the list with 214,472 votes, the highest total in the race's history. On 27 December she started the 1.5/1 favourite for the Arima Kinen ahead of Fierement while the other contenders included Curren Bouquetd'Or, Lucky Lilac, World Premiere, Loves Only You, Kiseki, Blast Onepiece and Persian Knight. After being restrained by Kitamura she made rapid progress on the backstretch and exited the final turn in third place behind the tiring pace-setter Babbitt and Fierement. She moved alongside Fierement in the straight and got the better of a sustained struggle with her male opponent before holding off the late run of the 73.9/1 outsider Salacia to win by a neck. After the race Kitamura said "All I wanted was her to be relaxed and her break wasn't that bad, she was in hand and ran in the same rhythm as before. Yesterday and today, I was in 2,500 meter-races here at Nakayama which enabled me to get warmed up with a good idea of how I wanted her to run," while Saito commented "She was in good form and gave us a great impression before the race. I was worried that Yuichi might have made a too early bid, but he was confident and rode her beautifully, holding off the others. This is a dream come true and I have a feeling there will be many more."

In January 2021 Chrono Genesis was given a JRA Special Award for her performances in 2020. In the 2020 World's Best Racehorse Rankings, Chrono Genesis was rated on 121, making her the equal 34th best racehorse in the world.

2021: five-year-old season
For her first appearance of 2021 Chrono Genesis was sent to Meydan Racecourse in Dubai to face international competition in the Dubai Sheema Classic.

Chrono Genesis ran the 2021 Arima Kinen as her final race before retirement. However, she lost to Efforia.

Pedigree

Chrono Genesis is inbred 4 × 4 to Mr. Prospector, meaning that this stallion appears twice in the fourth generation of her pedigree.

References

2016 racehorse births
Racehorses bred in Japan
Racehorses trained in Japan
Thoroughbred family 20-a